Portals is the first solo extended play (EP) by Metallica guitarist Kirk Hammett, released on April 23, 2022, through Blackened Recordings. The EP was released digitally as well as on CD and an exclusive ocean blue vinyl pressing for Record Store Day.

It consists of four instrumental tracks, described in a release as "a collection of gateways to myriad musical and psychic destinations." The songs were recorded between 2017 and 2020 in multiple locales ranging from Los Angeles to Paris to Oahu. Hammett added: "This music was created with what I describe as an Audio-Cinematic approach. They're soundtracks to the movies in your mind."

A single for the EP's third track "High Plains Drifter" was released on April 15, 2022, with an animated music video following April 22.

Style and reception 

Brave Words & Bloody Knuckless Nick Balazs calls the EP "more musically interesting then what his main band has done on their recent studio efforts", noting that on Metallica's records "Hammett's solos have been a point of criticism" but here "those criticisms will be put to bed as Portals shows a talented guitarist utilizing different effects and inspired sounds to create a diverse EP with much replay value." The songs "play out like mini-movies, or soundtracks to a theatrical film", showcasing Hammett's love of horror films and Clint Eastwood with "almost a '70s progressive bent". Balazs closes by calling the EP "a much pleasant surprise" and "a scarily good listen". Joe Daly of Metal Hammer notes Hammett "flex[ing] his prog and soundtrack-influenced muscles" and "synthesis[ing] his biggest influences: metal, horror movies, classical music and the works of composer Ennio Morricone". "None of the tracks sound like unused Metallica demos, nor do they bleed together in a brain-melting patchwork of sweep picking and speed runs", instead "showcas[ing] the compositional and technical strengths of one of heavy metal's most influential and visionary guitarists."

Pitchforks Jason P. Woodbury says the EP "reveals Hammett's aspirations to be a film composer, layering crescendoing horns, flamenco interludes, swelling strings—and, naturally, oversized riffs and unhinged shredding—into compositions that could accompany zombie westerns, gothic giallo thrillers, or apocalyptic sci-fi". On the project, Hammett "often eschews ambiance and scene setting in favor of fully present rock outs", though it "doesn't matter that the territory is more Thin Lizzy than Hans Zimmer" because "it's a thrill to hear Hammett playing so unabashed." Though Hammett is "often viewed as the soft spoken counterpoint to Ulrich and Hetfield", he "relishes this star turn, and his sense of freedom in exploring beyond the confines of Metallica is palpable", bringing out music which "smartly devote[s] plenty of real estate to Hammett's familiar metalhead strengths" but also "reveal[ing] compositional breadth and dramatic flair." Wall of Sound suggests that the EP is "well worth checking out" for those who enjoy instrumental albums, and while it "probably won't hold the attention of most Metallica fans, it is a rewarding sonic experience that I will be returning to when the mood strikes."

Accolades

Track listing

Personnel

Musicians
Kirk Hammett – guitar
Blake Neely – string arrangements 
Marcel Feldmar – drums 
Mathilde Sternat – cello 
Greg Fidelman – bass 
Philippe Bussonnet – bass 
Julien Charlet – percussion 
Abraham Laboriel – drums 
Edwin Outwater – keyboards, orchestra leader 
Emmanuel Ceysson – harp 
Ben Lash – cello 
Andrew Bain – horn 
Nadia Sirota – viola 
Nathan Cole – violin 
Akiko Turamoto – violin 
Eliza Bagg – vocals 
Jon Theodore – drums 
Brad Cummings – bass 

Technical
 Kirk Hammett – production, mixing
 Bob Rock – mixing
 Emily Lazar – mastering
 Chris Allgood – mastering
 Mike Gillies – engineering 
 Greg Fidelman – additional engineering, recording 
 Tim Harkins – engineering 
 Angel Hammett – photos
 Alex Tenta – design, layout

Charts

References

2022 debut EPs
Kirk Hammett albums
Progressive rock EPs
Heavy metal EPs
Classical music EPs
Instrumental rock EPs
Record Store Day releases